ShadowCon is the name of a science fiction and fantasy convention held in Memphis, Tennessee, annually since 1997.

ShadowCon started as the annual 12th Night or Yule/Christmas party for House Shadow Legion, a household within the Society for Creative Anachronism (SCA). It has everything normally found at a science fiction and fantasy or fan convention including panel discussions, guest authors and artists, costume contests, movie room, gaming (RPG, board gaming, miniatures, various LARPs, and console gaming) along with activities found at SCA events or Renaissance Fairs such as heavy weapons combat and bellydancing. Venders carry a range of merchandise including books (new, used, and small-press), games and gaming supplies, costume clothing, jewelry, artwork, and various items of SCA and fandom interest. Several other Memphis-area conventions and groups also have promotional tables at ShadowCon.

ShadowCon is held the first or second weekend of January, depending on the calendar. While ShadowCon is organized mostly by members of the Society for Creative Anachronism, the event is not officially recognized, sponsored, or sanctioned by SCA. Other local area groups and organizations also help with various Con activities.

The first ShadowCon was held in January 1997.

External links

Commercial Appeal Story News

science fiction conventions in the United States
fantasy conventions
Conventions in Tennessee
Annual events in Tennessee
Culture of Memphis, Tennessee
Recurring events established in 1997
Tourist attractions in Memphis, Tennessee